Ahmed Nagar Chattha is a small town in Wazirabad Tehsil, Gujranwala District, Punjab, Pakistan.

Demography
Ahmed Nager Chatha has a population of over 40,000 and is located about 45 kilometres northwest of Gujranwala city. The population is over 99% Muslim. Most people in the town speak Punjabi, though almost all of them can also speak the national language of Pakistan, Urdu. English is spoken by the educated elite.

Education
The Government Boys Higher Secondary School was established in 1910.
Other educational institutions include the Government Girls Higher Secondary School, Government Primary School, and Al-Faisal High School.

Notable people

 Abdul Hafeez Taib (1931-2006), poet.
 Hamid Nasir Chattha, politician, previously serving as Speaker of the National Assembly of Pakistan and as a government minister.

Communication
The only way to get to Ahmed Nager Chattha is by road. Besides driving your own car (which takes about 30 minutes from Gujranwala or Wazirabad), one can also catch a bus or van from Gujranwala or Wazirabad to get there. Ahmed Nagar Chatha is connected with Wazirabad via Wazirabad-Rasul Nagar Highway, though the city is situated a few kilometres away from this highway. Another road connects it with Gujranwala via Kalaskay. This city has a direct link with Gakhar via NoorKot.

Wazirabad-Faisalabad rail link is the only nearby railway line.

See also

 Gujranwala
 Ahmad Nagar

References

Cities and towns in Gujranwala District
Populated places in Wazirabad Tehsil
Union councils of Wazirabad Tehsil